Coleophora bassii is a moth of the family Coleophoridae that can be found in France and Italy.

References

External links

bassii
Moths described in 1989
Moths of Europe